Htilominlo Temple is a Buddhist temple located in Bagan (formerly Pagan), in Burma/Myanmar, built during the reign of King Htilominlo (also known as Nandaungmya), 1211–1231. It is also known for its elaborate plaster moldings. On the first floor of the temple, there are four Buddha statues that face each direction. The temple was damaged in the 1975 earthquake and subsequently repaired.

Notes

References

Buddhist temples in Myanmar
Religious buildings and structures completed in 1211
13th-century Buddhist temples